The cartography of Asia can refer to the representation of Asia on a map, or to depictions of the world by cartographers from Asia. Depictions of portions of Asia have existed on maps as early as the 6th century BCE, with maps being drafted to depict the Babylonian, Hellenistic Greek, and Han dynasty empires.

During the Middle Ages, Muslim geographers drew maps with more accurate depictions of Southern, Western, and Central Asia, and European maps began to more frequently represent Asia's landmass. Chinese geography from this period includes more detailed portrayals of the Indian Ocean, Arabian Peninsula, and East Africa. European maps of Asia would become much more accurate during the European Age of Discovery, starting in the 15th century.

Modern maps of Asia make use of digitization, photographic surveys, and satellite imagery.

Antiquity 
Babylon in Southwest Asia is at the center of the very earliest world maps, beginning with the Babylonian world map in the 6th century BCE; it is a clay tablet 'localized' world map of Babylon, rivers, encircling ocean, and terrain, surrounded by 'islands' in a 7-star format. In classical Greek geography, "Asia" is one of three major landmasses, besides Europe and Libya. Asia is given higher resolution in Hellenistic geography, in particular on Ptolemy world map. Cartography of India begins with early charts for navigation and constructional plans for buildings. Chinese geography from the 2nd century BC (Han dynasty) becomes aware of Turkestan, where Hellenistic Greek and Han Chinese spheres of influence overlap.

Middle Ages
In medieval T and O maps, Asia makes for half the world's landmass, with Africa and Europe accounting for a quarter each. With the High Middle Ages, Southwest and Central Asia receive better resolution in Muslim geography, and the 11th century map by Mahmud al-Kashgari is the first world map drawn from a Central Asian point of view. In the same period, European explorers of the Silk road like William Rubruck and Marco Polo increase geographical knowledge of Asia in the west, in particular establishing that the Caspian Sea is not connected to the northern ocean.

Chinese exploration by medieval times extends Chinese geographical knowledge to the Indian Ocean, the Arabian peninsula and East Africa as well as Southeast Asia.

Age of exploration

European maps of Asia become much more detailed from the 15th century, the 1459 Fra Mauro map showing a reasonable complete picture, including correctly placed Korea and Japan.

Modern maps
Modern map making techniques in Asia, like other parts of the world, employ digitization, photographic surveys and printing. Satellite imageries, aerial photographs and video surveying techniques  are also used.

Notes

See also 
 Geography of Asia
 Muslim geography
 Chinese geography
 Chinese exploration
 Cartography of India
 History of cartography
 History of geography
 Exploration of Asia
Cartography of Europe
Cartography of Africa
Boundaries between continents

References
 
 Sircar, D.C.C. (1990). Studies in the Geography of Ancient and Medieval India. Motilal Banarsidass Publishers. .

Literature 
 Harley and Woodward (eds.), The History of Cartography. Vol. 2. bk 2, Cartography in Traditional East and Southeast Asian Societies, University of Chicago Press (1994), .
 Kenneth Nebenzahl, Mapping the Silk Road and Beyond, .

External links 
 Historical maps of Asia, Alabama Maps project of the Cartographic Research Laboratory, University of Alabama. 
 Asia Historical Maps, Perry–Castañeda Library Map Collection, University of Texas, Austin.

 
Geography of Asia
Cartography by continent